Ola Torgeir Lånke (born 18 March 1948 in Rennebu) is a Norwegian politician for the Christian Democratic Party.

Lånke was elected to the Norwegian Parliament from Sør-Trøndelag in 1993, and has been re-elected on three occasions. On the local level he was a member of Trondheim city council from 1991 to 1993.

Lånke was the chairman of the Youth of the Christian People's Party, the youth wing of the Christian Democratic Party, from 1975 to 1976. Since 1997 he has been a member of the national Christian Democratic Party board.

Outside politics Lånke has worked as a priest, having graduated from the MF Norwegian School of Theology as cand.theol. in 1977.

References

1948 births
Living people
Christian Democratic Party (Norway) politicians
Members of the Storting
Politicians from Trondheim
People from Rennebu
Norwegian priest-politicians
MF Norwegian School of Theology, Religion and Society alumni
21st-century Norwegian politicians
20th-century Norwegian politicians